The 1994 NBL season was the 13th season of the National Basketball League. Only one change occurred heading into the 1994 season, with New Plymouth now called Taranaki. Nelson won the championship in 1994 to claim their first league title.

Final standings

Season awards
 NZ Most Valuable Player: Pero Cameron (Auckland)
 Most Outstanding Guard: Leonard King (Otago)
 Most Outstanding NZ Guard: Chris Tupu (Canterbury)
 Most Outstanding Forward: Darryl Johnson (Nelson)
 Most Outstanding NZ Forward/Centre: Pero Cameron (Auckland)
 Scoring Champion: DeWayne McCray (Hutt Valley)
 Rebounding Champion: Willie Burton (Hawke's Bay)
 Assist Champion: Wayman Strickland (North Harbour)
 Rookie of the Year: Konrad Ross (Waikato)
 Coach of the Year: Trevor Wright (Nelson)
 All-Star Five:
 G: Leonard King (Otago)
 G: Tony Brown (Palmerston North)
 F: Darryl Johnson (Nelson)
 F: DeWayne McCray (Hutt Valley)
 C: Pero Cameron (Auckland)

References

National Basketball League (New Zealand) seasons
1994 in New Zealand basketball